Rainer Bieli (born 22 February 1979) is a former footballer from Switzerland who last played as forward for FC Baden in the Swiss First League.

External links
Football.ch profile

1979 births
Living people
Swiss men's footballers
Switzerland under-21 international footballers
Grasshopper Club Zürich players
FC Baden players
Neuchâtel Xamax FCS players
FC St. Gallen players
FC Aarau players
FC Concordia Basel players
Swiss Super League players
Swiss Challenge League players
Association football forwards